Providence is an unincorporated community in Bureau County, Illinois, United States, located west-southwest of Tiskilwa. In 1836 A group of 72 stockholders from Providence, Rhode Island created plans for a colony in Illinois. The group purchased 17,000 acres of land. In 1837 around 40 individuals came to live on the land which was became Providence, Illinois.

References

Unincorporated communities in Bureau County, Illinois
Unincorporated communities in Illinois